Yanki Tauber (born 1965) is a Hasidic scholar, rabbi, writer and editor. From 1999 to 2013 he served as chief content editor of Chabad.org. He is currently chief writer and editor of  The Book, a new translation and anthologized commentary for The Five Books of Moses.
Tauber received his rabbinical ordination from Yeshivat Tomchei Temimim in 1987. He has taught and lectured at the Maayanot Institute of Jewish Studies in Jerusalem, the Eliezer Society at Yale University, and other academic forums.  He is the author of three books and more than 800 essays of biblical commentary and Jewish and Hasidic thought. His writings have been translated into Spanish, German, French and other languages.

Personal life 

Tauber is married to Riki Tauber and the couple has three daughters—Leah, Chany, and Racheli, who currently studies at the seminary Amudim.

References

External links 

Essays by Yanki Tauber on Chabad.org
Essays by Yanki Tauber on Meaningfullife.com
Books by Yanki Tauber
Interview with Yanki Tauber by Rabbi Shais Taub

1965 births
Living people
Jewish writers
Chabad-Lubavitch Hasidim
People from Brooklyn
Hasidic writers